The 2013 Gibraltar Darts Trophy was the fifth of eight PDC European Tour events on the 2013 PDC Pro Tour. The tournament took place at the Victoria Stadium, Gibraltar, from 28–30 June 2013. It featured a field of 64 players and £100,000 in prize money, with £20,000 going to the winner. It was won by Phil Taylor, with Jamie Lewis as the runner-up.

Also notable was the nine-dart finish hit by Ross Smith in his second round defeat by Adrian Lewis, which was the last nine darter to be hit in the PDC European Tour until June 2018.

Course of the event
Phil Taylor won his second European Tour title with a 6–1 victory over Jamie Lewis in the final. He had previously beaten Steve Beaton 6-0 in the last eight and Dave Chisnall 6-2 in the semi-finals, recording an average score of 112.73 in the former. The £20,000 first prize was Taylor's second win in June 2013, having earlier won the 2013 UK Open title. Taylor's victory was his first European Tour win since Berlin in June 2012, adding to a career that has led to him being called the greatest ever darts player. He told the Staffordshire newspaper The Sentinel, "It's fantastic to win this and I am over the moon. It's been a great weekend for me and I've really enjoyed it in Gibraltar."

The tournament's biggest surprise was Jamie Lewis' appearance in the final. He reached his first senior final after having to qualify to take part in the event, and was aiming to win one match and the £1,000 prize money, so that he would earn a place in the world top 64 and would avoid having to need to qualify for the 2014 PDC European Tour.

The event was the first-ever Gibraltar Darts Trophy, sponsored by the Government of Gibraltar at a reported cost of £100,000. Although it was not broadcast live, it was covered by Sky Sports. The trophy was presented by the territory's Sports Minister, Stephen Linares. Four Gibraltarian players participated as home nation qualifiers, but were all eliminated in the opening round.

Prize money

Qualification
The top 32 players from the PDC ProTour Order of Merit on the 22 May 2013 automatically qualified for the event. The remaining 32 places went to players from three qualifying events - 20 from the UK Qualifier (held in Wigan on 24 May), eight from the European Qualifier (held at the venue in Gibraltar on 27 June) and four from the Host Nation Qualifier (held in Gibraltar on 24 April).

1–32

UK Qualifier
  Peter Hudson (first round)
  John Henderson (third round)
  Kevin McDine (first round)
  Joe Cullen (first round)
  Joe Murnan (first round)
  Connie Finnan (second round)
  Steve Maish (first round)
  Nigel Heydon (first round)
  Jamie Lewis (runner-up)
  Mickey Mansell (first round)
  Mark Hylton (first round)
  Jim Walker (first round)
  Dean Winstanley (second round)
  Matthew Dennant (first round)
  Ross Smith (second round)
  John Bowles (first round)
  Matthew Edgar (first round)
  Paul Amos (second round)
  Steve Brown (third round)
  Josh Payne (second round)

European Qualifier
  Gino Vos (first round)
  Vincent van der Voort (first round)
  Ronny Huybrechts (first round)
  Mensur Suljović (second round)
  Jani Haavisto (second round)
  Leo Hendriks (first round)
  Jelle Klaasen (first round)
  Leon de Geus (third round)

Host Nation Qualifier
  Dylan Duo (first round)
  Dyson Parody (first round)
  Manuel Vilerio (first round)
  George Federico (first round)

Draw

References

2013 PDC European Tour
2013 in Gibraltarian sport
Darts in Gibraltar